Sir Raymond William Firth   (25 March 1901 – 22 February 2002) was an ethnologist from New Zealand. As a result of Firth's ethnographic work, actual behaviour of societies (social organization) is separated from the idealized rules of behaviour within the particular society (social structure). He was a long serving Professor of Anthropology at London School of Economics, and is considered to have singlehandedly created a form of British economic anthropology.

Early life and academic career
Firth was born to Wesley and Marie Firth in Auckland, New Zealand, in 1901. He was educated at Auckland Grammar School, and then at Auckland University College, where he graduated in economics in 1921. He took his economics MA there in 1922 with a 'fieldwork' based research thesis on the Kauri Gum digging industry, then a diploma in social science in 1923. In 1924 he began his doctoral research at the London School of Economics. Originally intending to complete a thesis in economics, a chance meeting with the eminent social anthropologist Bronisław Malinowski led to him to alter his field of study to 'blending economic and anthropological theory with Pacific ethnography'. It was possibly during this period in England that he worked as research assistant to Sir James G Frazer, author of The Golden Bough. Firth's doctoral thesis was published in 1929 as Primitive Economics of the New Zealand Māori.

After receiving his PhD in 1927 Firth returned to the southern hemisphere to take up a position at the University of Sydney, although he did not start teaching immediately as a research opportunity presented itself. In 1928 he first visited Tikopia, the southernmost of the Solomon Islands, to study the untouched Polynesian society there, resistant to outside influences and still with its pagan religion and undeveloped economy. This was the beginning of a long relationship with the 1200 people of the remote four-mile long island, and resulted in ten books and numerous articles written over many years. The first of these, We the Tikopia: A Sociological Study of Kinship in Primitive Polynesia was published in 1936 and seventy years on is still used as a basis for many university courses about Oceania.

In 1930 he started teaching at the University of Sydney. On the departure for Chicago of Alfred Radcliffe-Brown, Firth succeeded him as acting Professor. He also took over from Radcliffe-Brown as acting editor of the journal Oceania, and as acting director of the Anthropology Research Committee of the Australian National Research Committee.

After 18 months he returned to the London School of Economics in 1933 to take up a lectureship, and was appointed Reader in 1935. Together with his wife Rosemary Firth, also to become a distinguished anthropologist, he undertook fieldwork in Kelantan and Terengganu in Malaya in 1939–1940. During the Second World War Firth worked for British naval intelligence, primarily writing and editing the four volumes of the Naval Intelligence Division Geographical Handbook Series that concerned the Pacific Islands. During this period Firth was based in Cambridge, where the LSE had its wartime home.

Firth succeeded Malinowski as Professor of Social Anthropology at LSE in 1944, and he remained at the School for the next 24 years. In the late 1940s he was a member of the Academic Advisory Committee of the then-fledgling Australian National University, along with Sir Howard Florey (co-developer of medicinal penicillin), Sir Mark Oliphant (a nuclear physicist who worked on the Manhattan Project), and Sir Keith Hancock (Chichele Professor of Economic History at Oxford). Firth was particularly focused on the creation of the university's School of Pacific Studies.

He returned to Tikopia on research visits several times, although as travel and fieldwork requirements became more burdensome he focused on family and kinship relationships in working- and middle-class London. Firth left LSE in 1968, when he took up a year's appointment as Professor of Pacific Anthropology at the University of Hawaii. There followed visiting professorships at British Columbia (1969), Cornell (1970), Chicago (1970–1), the Graduate School of the City University of New York (1971) and UC Davis (1974). The second festschrift published in his honour described him as 'perhaps the greatest living teacher of anthropology today'.

After retiring from teaching work, Firth continued with his research interests, and right up until his hundredth year he was producing articles. He died in London a few weeks before his 101st birthday: his father had lived to 104.

Honours
1949 Fellow of the British Academy
1958 Viking Fund Medal
1959 Huxley Memorial Medal 
1963 elected to the American Academy of Arts and Sciences 
1965 elected to the American Philosophical Society 
1973 Knighted
1981 Bronislaw Malinowski Award
2001 Companion of the New Zealand Order of Merit in the 2001 Queen's Birthday Honours, for services to anthropology
2002 Received the first Leverhulme Medal for a scholar of international distinction

Personal life
Firth married Rosemary Firth (née Upcott) in 1936; they had one son, Hugh, who was born in 1946. Rosemary died in 2001. Firth was raised a Methodist then later became a humanist and an atheist, a decision influenced by his anthropological studies. He was one of the signers of the Humanist Manifesto. The Firths bought a cottage in the West Dorset village of Thorncombe in 1937; it was their second home until Raymond's death in 2002.

Māori lament (poroporoaki) for Sir Raymond Firth
Composed on behalf of the Polynesian Society by its then-President, Professor Sir Hugh Kawharu (English translation)

You have left us now, Sir Raymond
Your body has been pierced by the spear of death
And so farewell. Farewell,
Scholar renowned in halls of learning throughout the world
'Navigator of the Pacific'
'Black hawk' of Tamaki.

Perhaps in the end you were unable to complete all
the research plans that you had once imposed upon yourself
But no matter! The truly magnificent legacy you have left
will be an enduring testimony to your stature.
		
Moreover, your spirit is still alive among us,
We, who have become separated from you in New Zealand,
in Tikopia and elsewhere.

Be at rest, father. Rest, forever,
in peace, and in the care of the Almighty.

Selected bibliography
 'The Korekore Pa' Journal of the Polynesian Society 34:1–18 (1925)
 'The Māori Carver' Journal of the Polynesian Society 34:277–291 (1925)
 Primitive Economics of the New Zealand Māori London: George Routledge and Sons (1929) (with a preface by R.H. Tawney)
 We the Tikopia: A Sociological Study of Kinship in Primitive Polynesia London: Allen and Unwin (1936)
 Human Types: An Introduction to Social Anthropology (1958)
 Primitive Polynesian Economy London: Routledge & Sons, Ltd (1939)
 The Work of the Gods in Tikopia Melbourne: Melbourne University Press (1940, 1967)
 'The Coastal People of Kelantan and Trengganu, Malaya' Geographical Journal 101(5/6):193-205 (1943)
 Pacific Islands Volume 2: Eastern Pacific (ed, with J. W. Davidson and Margaret Davies), Naval Intelligence Division Geographical Handbook Series, HMSO (November 1943)
 Pacific Islands Volume 3: Western Pacific (Tonga to the Solomon Islands) (ed, with J W Davidson and Margaret Davies), Naval Intelligence Division Geographical Handbook Series, HMSO (December 1944)
 Pacific Islands Volume 4: Western Pacific (New Guinea and Islands Northwards) (ed, with J W Davidson and Margaret Davies), Naval Intelligence Division Geographical Handbook Series, HMSO (August 1945)
 Pacific Islands Volume 1: General Survey (ed, with J W Davidson and Margaret Davies), Naval Intelligence Division Geographical Handbook Series, HMSO (August 1945)
 Malay Fishermen: Their Peasant Economy London: Kegan Paul, Trench, Trubner (1946)
 Elements of Social Organization London: Watts and Co (1951)
 'Social Organization and Social Change' Journal of the Royal Anthropological Institute 84:1–20 (1954)
 'Some Principles of Social Organization' Journal of the Royal Anthropological Institute 85:1–18 (1955)
 Man and Culture: An Evaluation of the Work of Malinowski Raymond Firth (ed) (1957)
 Economics of the New Zealand Māori Wellington: Government Printer (1959) (revised edition of Primitive Economics of the New Zealand Māori (1929))
 Social Change in Tikopia (1959)
 Essays on Social Organization and Values London School of Economics Monographs on Social Anthropology, no. 28. London: Athlone Press (1964)
 Tikopia Ritual and Belief (1967)
 'Themes in Economic Anthropology: A General Comment' in Themes in Economic Anthropology Raymond Firth, ed. 1–28. London: Tavistock (1967)
 Rank and Religion in Tikopia (1970)
 History and Traditions of Tikopia (1971)
 Symbols: Public and Private (1973)
 'The Sceptical Anthropologist? Social Anthropology and Marxist Views on Society' in Marxist Analyses and Social Anthropology M. Bloch, ed. 29–60. London: Malaby (1975)
 'An Appraisal of Modern Social Anthropology' Annual Review of Anthropology 4:1–25 (1975)
 'Whose Frame of Reference? One Anthropologist's Experience' Anthropological Forum 4(2):9–31 (1977)
 'Roles of Women and Men in a Sea Fishing Economy: Tikopia Compared with Kelantan' in The Fishing Culture of the World: Studies in Ethnology, Cultural Ecology and Folklore Béla Gunda (ed) Budapest: Akadémiai Kiadó 1145–1170 (1984)
 Taranga Fakatikopia ma Taranga Fakainglisi: Tikopia-English Dictionary (1985)
 
 Religion: A Humanist Interpretation (1996)
 'Tikopia Dreams: Personal Images of Social Reality' Journal of the Polynesian Society 110(1):7–29 (2001)
 'The Creative Contribution of Indigenous People to Their Ethnography' Journal of the Polynesian Society 110(3):241–245 (2001)

Other sources
 Feinberg, Richard and Karen Ann Watson-Gegeo (eds) (1996) Leadership and Change in the Western Pacific: Essays Presented to Sir Raymond Firth on Occasion of his 90th Birthday London School of Economics Monographs on Social Anthropology. London: Athlone (third festschrift for Raymond Firth).
Foks, Freddy (2020) 'Raymond Firth, Between Economics and Anthropology', in BEROSE –  International Encyclopaedia of the Histories of Anthropology, Paris.
 Freedman, Maurice (ed) (1967) Social Organization: Essays Presented to Raymond Firth Chicago: Aldine (first festschrift for Raymond Firth).
Laviolette, Patrick (2020) 'Mana and Māori culture: Raymond Firth's pre-Tikopia years'. History and Anthropology 31(3): 393-409.
 Macdonald, Judith (2000) 'The Tikopia and "What Raymond Said"' in Sjoerd R. Jaarsma and Marta A. Rohatynskyj (eds), Ethnographic Artifacts: Challenges to a Reflexive Anthropology Honolulu: University of Hawaii Press 107–23.
 Parkin, David (1988) 'An interview with Raymond Firth' Current Anthropology 29(2):327–41.
 Watson-Gegeo, Karen Ann and S. Lee Seaton, (eds) (1978) Adaptation and Symbolism: Essays on Social Organization Honolulu: University of Hawaii Press (second festschift for Sir Raymond Firth).
Young, Michael (2003) Obituaries: Raymond William Firth, 1901-2002. Journal of Pacific History 38(2): 277-80.

Papers
Sir Raymond Firth's papers are held at the London School of Economics – including his photographic collection

References

External links
Interviewed by Alan Macfarlane 8 July 1983 (poor video recording)
Article on Firth's time at LSE
Daily Telegraph obituary
Firth's papers at LSE Archives
New York Times: Sir Raymond Firth, 100, Expert on Polynesia Life 
Raymond Firth at "Pioneers of Qualitative Research" from the Economic and Social Data Service
Raymond Firth music field recordings 
Resources related to research : BEROSE – International Encyclopaedia of the Histories of Anthropology. "Firth, Raymond (1901–2002)", Paris, 2020. (ISSN 2648-2770)

Social anthropologists
Economic anthropologists
Anthropologists of religion
British humanists
New Zealand anthropologists
Companions of the New Zealand Order of Merit
Fellows of the British Academy
Academics of the London School of Economics
New Zealand centenarians
Men centenarians
1901 births
2002 deaths
People educated at Auckland Grammar School
University of Auckland alumni
New Zealand Knights Bachelor
Fellows of the Royal Anthropological Institute of Great Britain and Ireland
Presidents of the Royal Anthropological Institute of Great Britain and Ireland
Alumni of the London School of Economics
20th-century anthropologists
New Zealand emigrants to the United Kingdom
Members of the American Philosophical Society